David Warburton (30 May 1919 – 4 February 1941) was an English first-class cricketer and Royal Air Force Volunteer Reserve officer.

The son of The Reverend Robert Warburton, he was born at Huddersfield in May 1919. He was educated at Leeds Grammar School, before going up to Brasenose College, Oxford in 1938. While studying at Oxford, he made a single appearance in first-class cricket for Oxford University against Gloucestershire at Oxford in 1939. Batting twice in the match, he was dismissed for 4 runs in the Oxford first-innings by Tom Goddard, while in their second innings he was dismissed without scoring by the same bowler. With his right-arm fast bowling, he bowled a total of eight overs without taking a wicket. Due to the slow nature of the wickets at the start of the cricket season, he was not afforded further opportunities and this was to be Warburton's only first-class appearance for Oxford.

The start of the Second World War in September 1939 meant that just two weeks after returning to Oxford after the summer term, Warburton found himself in the Royal Air Force Volunteer Reserve, initially holding the rank of sergeant before being commissioned as a flying officer. He was promoted to flying officer in September 1940. After completing his training he helped to train Polish pilots of the Polish Air Force. On 4 February 1941, Warburton was flying a Wellington bomber from No. 18 Operational Training Unit on a training mission with a mixture of Polish and British aircrew. While flying over Crewe, the bomber was hit by friendly fire from a Home Guard anti aircraft unit near the Rolls-Royce factory and subsequently collided with a barrage balloon, crashing and killing all on board. He was buried at West Knoyle in Wiltshire, near to the family home at Mere.

References

External links

1919 births
1941 deaths
Cricketers from Huddersfield
People educated at Leeds Grammar School
Alumni of Brasenose College, Oxford
English cricketers
Oxford University cricketers
Royal Air Force officers
Royal Air Force Volunteer Reserve personnel of World War II
Royal Air Force personnel killed in World War II
Victims of aviation accidents or incidents in 1941
Aviators killed in aviation accidents or incidents in England
Friendly fire incidents of World War II
Military personnel killed by friendly fire
Military personnel from Yorkshire